Susan Marie Powell ( Cox; born October 16, 1981) is an American missing person from West Valley City, Utah, whose disappearance and presumed murder, as well as the subsequent investigation and events, garnered national media attention. Susan's husband Joshua was named a person of interest in the investigation into her disappearance but was never charged. On February 5, 2012, Joshua killed himself and their two young sons, Charles Joshua Powell (January 19, 2005 – February 5, 2012) and Braden Timothy Powell (January 2, 2007 – February 5, 2012), in a murder–suicide after custody of the boys had been awarded to Susan's parents, Judy and Charles Cox.

On May 21, 2013, West Valley City police closed their active investigation into Susan's disappearance, stating that they believed Joshua murdered her and that his brother, Michael – who also committed suicide in February 2013 after suspicion grew around him – had assisted him in concealing her body. Since then, there have been repeated attempts to have Susan legally declared dead.

Background 
Joshua Powell was born on January 20, 1976, to Steven and Terrica Powell in Puyallup, Washington. Joshua's parents had a dysfunctional marriage, caused in large part by Steven's violent abuse of his family and by his disaffection with the Church of Jesus Christ of Latter-day Saints (LDS Church). According to divorce filings by Terrica in 1992, Steven shared pornography with Joshua and his two brothers and refused to teach or enforce limits on certain behaviors. As a teenager, Joshua allegedly killed gerbils belonging to one of his sisters and threatened his mother with a butcher knife. He also attempted suicide on at least one occasion.

By the late 1990s, Joshua was living in Seattle as a student at the University of Washington. It was here that he began a relationship with a young woman named Catherine Terry Everett, whom he met at a local LDS Church congregation. After the two moved into an apartment together, Joshua became possessive towards Everett. "He would have restrictions and limitations on what I could and couldn't do when it came to my family," she later recalled. "If I was going to go visit them, he had to come too. I couldn't go by myself." When Everett visited a friend in Utah without Joshua, she decided not to return to Seattle and broke up with him over the phone.

Joshua met Susan Cox, a classmate at his LDS Church Institute of Religion course, during a dinner party at his Tacoma apartment in November 2000. The two began a relationship and married in the Portland Oregon Temple in April 2001. Joshua had a bachelor's degree in business and worked for a number of different companies over the years, while Susan, a trained cosmetologist, took up a job with Wells Fargo Investments after the family's relocation to West Valley City, Utah, a suburb of Salt Lake City. The Powells went on to have two sons: Charles, born in 2005, and Braden, born in 2007.

For a brief period following their wedding, Joshua and Susan lived at Steven Powell's home in South Hill, Washington. Initially unbeknownst to Susan, her father-in-law Steven had developed an obsessive infatuation with her which was only inflamed by their close proximity. Steven followed Susan around the house with a camcorder, used a small mirror to spy on her while she used the bathroom, stole her underwear from her laundry, read her journals, and even posted love songs online under a pseudonym. In 2003, Steven confessed his amorous feelings to a stunned Susan, who rejected him; the encounter was inadvertently captured by Steven's camcorder microphone. The Powells moved out-of-state soon after, partly so Susan could distance herself from Steven.

Susan's journal entries and email correspondence indicated the presence of marital discord. There was tension with Joshua over his refusal to attend church services with his family and over his continued contact with Steven despite his father's ongoing advances toward Susan. Susan's friends also pointed to Joshua's "extremely controlling" behavior towards his wife and to his extravagant spending habits. Joshua filed for bankruptcy in 2007, declaring over $200,000 in debts. Susan recorded a video in July 2008 surveying property damage she attributed to Joshua, and wrote a secret will that included the statements, "I want it documented that there is extreme turmoil in our marriage" and, "If I die, it may not be an accident, even if it looks like one."

Disappearance
On the morning of December 6, 2009, Susan, Charles and Braden attended church services. A neighbor visited them at home in the afternoon, leaving at about 5:00 p.m. This was the last time Susan was seen by someone from outside the Powell household.

At first, the entire Powell family was reported missing on December 7 by relatives. Joshua's mother, Terrica, and his sister, Jennifer Graves, went looking for them at their house shortly after being informed that the children had not been dropped off at daycare that morning. They called the police when they failed to make contact with Joshua and Susan. The police broke into the house, fearing that the family members were victims of carbon monoxide poisoning. They found no one inside, but noticed two box fans blowing at a wet spot on the couch. Susan did not show up at her job on December 7; her purse, wallet, and identification were all found at the house. Her cell phone was later found in the family's only vehicle, a Chrysler Town & Country minivan, that Joshua had been using.

Later that day, at about 5:00 p.m., Joshua returned home with the two boys and was taken to the police station for questioning. He claimed he had left Susan sleeping at home shortly after midnight on December 7, and had taken his boys on a camping trip to Simpson Springs in western Utah. Police visited Simpson Springs on December 10, but found no evidence of the campsite that Joshua had described. They also found it suspicious that Joshua would take his young boys out camping in blizzard conditions after midnight when they were scheduled to go to daycare just hours later. Joshua had additionally not told his boss that he would not be coming into work that day, and explained to police it was because he had thought it was Sunday rather than Monday.

Investigation
DNA test results, released in 2013, matched one blood sample with Susan, while another sample was determined to have come from an "unknown male contributor".

In August 2012, West Valley City police released documents showing that Joshua took actions that were regarded as highly suspicious following Susan's disappearance. Joshua liquidated Susan's retirement accounts, cancelled her regularly scheduled chiropractic sessions, and withdrew his children from daycare. He had also previously spoken to coworkers about how to hide a body in an abandoned mineshaft in the western Utah desert.

Police interviewed the couple's elder son, Charlie, who confirmed that the camping trip Joshua described took place; however, unlike his father, he stated that Susan had gone with them and she did not return. Weeks after her disappearance, a teacher reported that Charlie had claimed that his mother was dead. Furthermore, Susan's parents, Chuck and Judy Cox, claimed that while at daycare several months after the disappearance, Braden drew a picture of a van with three people in it and told carers that, "Mommy was in the trunk".

Investigators informed the media that they planned to question Joshua again, and subpoenaed all footage and interviews (aired and unaired) of Joshua from local television stations. On December 14, Joshua retained an attorney in connection with the investigation, and police said that he grew increasingly uncooperative. A few days later, he took his sons to Puyallup to stay with Steven for the holidays. By December 24, Joshua was considered a person of interest in the investigation. On January 6, 2010, he returned with his brother, Michael, to pack the family's belongings, indicating he was moving permanently to Puyallup.

Developments in 2010–2012
In Puyallup, Joshua occupied a home with his two sons, his father Steven, his brothers Michael and Jonathan, and his sister Alina. Joshua indicated that he would rent out his house in Utah. It was reported that he returned to Puyallup after he had lost his job.

Soon afterwards, the website SusanPowell.org was launched. Described as "the official website of Susan Powell", the site's anonymous entries defended Joshua  as the victim of a smear campaign by Susan's family, his estranged sister Jennifer, and the LDS Church. Additional posts also speculated that Susan's disappearance was connected to that of Steven Koecher, a former journalist who vanished the same week as Susan, and that the two had run off to Brazil together. Joshua and Steven were widely believed to have written these posts. In late 2010, both men claimed that Susan had abandoned her family due to mental illness and that she had left with another man. Susan's family rejected these claims as being "unsupported" by any evidence.

Investigators' scrutiny extended to Steven upon learning from a family friend that he had been obsessed with his son's wife. Computer images seized from his house in 2010 turned up 4,500 images of Susan taken without her knowledge, including close-ups of specific body parts. Police also turned their attention to Michael after learning that he had sold his broken-down Ford Taurus to a wrecking yard in Pendleton, Oregon, shortly after Susan's disappearance, and had later ordered satellite images of the lot. When police found the car, a sniffer dog indicated that a decomposing human body had been in the trunk. DNA tests on the car proved inconclusive.

On September 14, 2011, Utah authorities discovered a possible gravesite while searching Topaz Mountain, a desert area near Nephi that Joshua had frequented as a campsite. There were signs of recent soil disturbance and shoveling, but after digging a few feet down, police were unable to find any remains, in spite of careful sifting of the soil. Federal anthropologists also ruled out the possibility of the site being an ancient burial ground. Police continued to examine the site for a time, but offered no explanation as to why they previously announced the finding of remains when none had actually been confirmed. Authorities said they were following a scent detected by their sniffer dogs.

Relations between and within the Powell and Cox families became increasingly hostile. After a police raid in their home in 2011, both Joshua and Steven spoke to major news outlets regarding journals that Susan had allegedly written about the relationship between Steven and herself. Steven claimed that he and Susan had been falling in love prior to her disappearance, and he cited the content of the journals (written when Susan was a teenager) as evidence to support his theory that she was mentally unstable and could have run away with another man. A judge issued a permanent injunction forbidding Joshua and Steven from publishing any material from Susan's journals, ordering the pair to either return or destroy any journals already published.

On September 22, Steven was arrested on charges of voyeurism and child pornography after police found evidence that he had secretly videotaped numerous women and young girls, including Susan. John Long, assistant attorney general for Washington State, said that Joshua was a "subject" in the child pornography investigation. A friend of Steven claimed that he was preoccupied with pornography and "was hung up on [Susan] sexually". Chuck Cox filed for custody of Susan's children the day after Steven was arrested. A Washington court eventually granted Cox temporary custody of the boys, ruling that Joshua would have to move out of Steven's home if he wanted to regain custody. Joshua rented a house in South Hill, but authorities later alleged that he had never actually moved into that house, merely making it appear as if he had satisfied the court's instructions while continuing to reside at Steven's home.

In late September 2011, Joshua's sister Jennifer stated that she believed Joshua was "responsible for his wife Susan Powell's disappearance". His other sister Alina had also been suspicious of him as well; however, she later withdrew her suspicions and felt that Joshua had been unduly harassed by the investigation. By this time, West Valley City had spent more than half a million dollars on the case. On September 28, Mayor Mike Winder indicated that he felt that the case was worth the expense, stating, "We feel that we are getting to that tipping point where we have more hot evidence than we have had in the past two years", and that the case was moving forward.

In late 2011, Joshua underwent a series of court-ordered evaluations in Washington. The evaluations by James Manley determined that Joshua had adequate parenting skills, a steady employment history and no criminal record or history of domestic violence. However, Manley also raised issues concerning the ongoing criminal investigations, Joshua's failure to admit normal personal shortcomings, his overbearing behavior with his sons, and his persistent defensiveness and paranoia (attributed to the police and media attention in conjunction with underlying narcissistic traits). The initial recommendation was for Joshua to have visitation with his sons several times a week, supervised by a social worker.

In the last week of January 2012, Utah police discovered about 400 images of simulated child pornography, bestiality and incest on a computer seized from the Powell family home. The pornography had been cached when viewed by the previous owner of the computer, which had been purchased by Susan secondhand. However, Utah authorities misled the court and accused Joshua of having viewed the images. The images, while not illegal due to them being in a hand-drawn or cartoonish 3-D format, were cause for "great concern" to Manley, particularly given Joshua's earlier denial of possessing any such material. Joshua was recommended to receive a more thorough psychosexual evaluation and polygraph test, but Manley suggested no change in the visitation schedule with the Powell boys.

Meanwhile, Michael established a Google Sites page which claimed that Susan's parents were abusing and neglecting the boys in collusion with child welfare authorities, and that West Valley City police had both mishandled the investigation into Susan's disappearance and were harassing Joshua. Lawyers for the Cox family disputed the allegations and Google removed the site after a few days due to terms of use violations.

Murders of Charles and Braden Powell

On February 5, 2012, social worker Elizabeth Griffin Hall called 9-1-1 after taking Charlie and Braden to a supervised visit at Joshua's house in South Hill. Hall, who was supposed to monitor the visit between Joshua and the boys, reported that he grabbed them and would not let her through the door. Soon thereafter, the house exploded, killing Joshua and the two children. Local authorities treated the case as a double murder-suicide, saying that the act appeared to have been deliberate.

When authorities notified Steven, who was in jail, he "didn't seem very upset by the news, but was angry towards authorities who notified him". Two weeks later, Steven invoked his Fifth Amendment right not to answer questions regarding Susan's disappearance. Cox and others have stated they believe that Steven knew what actually happened to Susan. Steven was convicted of voyeurism charges in May 2012 in a trial which largely skirted the issue of Susan's case.

After a relatively brief investigation, officials confirmed that the explosion had been deliberately planned. The official cause of death for Joshua and the two boys was determined to be carbon monoxide poisoning, though the coroner also noted that both children had significant chopping injuries on the head and neck. A hatchet was recovered near Joshua's body, and investigators believe that he attacked the boys with it before being overwhelmed by smoke and fumes. The fire investigation also found two five-gallon cans of gasoline on the premises, as well as evidence that gasoline had been spread throughout the house.

Friends and relatives of Joshua told authorities that he had contacted them by email minutes before the incident to say goodbye. Some of them, including his local bishop, received instructions for finding his money and shutting off his utilities. Records also showed that Joshua had withdrawn $7,000 from his bank account and had donated his children's toys and books to local charities the day before the incident. Joshua named his brother Michael as the main beneficiary of his life insurance policy.

Charles and Braden are buried at Woodbine Cemetery, which also contains a memorial for their mother. Joshua's remains were cremated.

Aftermath 
On February 11, 2013, approximately one year after the death of Joshua and his sons, Michael Powell killed himself in Minneapolis, Minnesota, where he had moved for graduate school. He jumped from the roof of a parking garage. Police had questioned Michael several times in 2012 after discovering his abandoned Ford at the Oregon wrecking yard; Michael was "evasive" about why he left the car at that location. Utah authorities have since said they believe that Joshua and Michael were accomplices in the murder of Susan.

In a February 2013 interview, Manley, who had conducted the 2011–2012 evaluations of Joshua for Washington authorities, acknowledged his suspicions that Joshua was involved in his wife's disappearance. However, he did not mention these suspicions in his report because they were beyond the scope of his duties and because Joshua had not been charged with any wrongdoing.

On May 21, 2013, West Valley City police announced that they had closed the active investigation into Susan's disappearance.

Joshua's sister, Jennifer, wrote a memoir with co-author Emily Clawson about the Powell family's tumultuous history. The memoir was published in June 2013 as A Light In Dark Places. Jennifer was inspired to write the book, she says, "to help other people to recognize abuse in either their own relationships or relationships around them, because it's not always completely apparent."

In March 2015, Chuck Cox won a protracted court battle with Terrica and Alina Powell over control of Susan's estate. Terrica and Alina had sought to have Susan declared legally dead to collect life insurance, but Cox ultimately gained full control of the estate. The Cox family also sued Washington's Department of Social and Health Services (DSHS) and its social workers, claiming that the agency prioritized Joshua's parental rights over the safety of the boys and facilitated their deaths. In 2015, a federal court granted summary judgement to the defendants, ruling that the social workers had immunity and DSHS was not negligent. In 2019, an appeals court partially overturned that decision, ruling that the social workers did have immunity but the question of DSHS's negligence could proceed to trial. At trial, a jury ruled that DSHS was negligent and awarded $98 million to the estates of Susan's two sons. Susan's family also pressured state lawmakers in Washington and Utah to pass bills that would restrict or block visitation rights for parents being investigated for murder.

Steven Powell was released from prison on July 11, 2017, after serving a total of seven years following his voyeurism and child pornography convictions. He died of natural causes in Tacoma, Washington, on July 23, 2018.

In 2019, the COLD podcast disclosed that the "incestuous cartoon porn" found by Utah police was not Joshua's, nor even came from his computer. The pornographic pictures were found to be on a computer that actually belonged to Susan and that the pornography had been viewed by the computer's previous owners, fellow members of her LDS church, from whom she had purchased the used computer secondhand. Cold declined to identify the original owners of the computer because, as the host stated, he had a conflict of interest as an acquaintance of the previous owners of the computer as well as their shared membership in the LDS church. No criminal charges have been filed against anyone related to the images.

Susan remains a missing person, but given the fates of her sons, it is widely believed that she was murdered by her husband Joshua. There were calls  to have her declared dead, with the cause being homicide.

In early 2022, a cave exploration crew led by Diesel Brothers personality Dave Sparks took up the challenge of searching a mine shaft in the Utah desert in search of Susan's remains. The team discovered several rib bones, possible human vertebrae, scraps of clothing, and other possible evidence of human remains in the mine shaft. The remains were sent to a lab, with DNA tests concluding that none of the bones belonged to Powell, but were instead animal remains. Pants recovered with the bones tested positive for male DNA and the family is trying to identify the man.

In media
In October 2018, the Crime Junkie podcast covered the case in one of its episodes titled "Murdered: The Powell Family".

Dave Cawley, a reporter for KSL Newsradio in Salt Lake City, began a podcast on the Susan Powell case in November 2018. The podcast, titled Cold, offers evidence and information from the case that has never before been made public, such as voice and video recordings, interviews, and more. On February 10, 2021, a TV series development deal for the COLD podcast was announced.

In December 2018, Investigation Discovery premiered an 85-minute documentary titled Susan Powell: An ID Murder Mystery.

A documentary titled The Disappearance of Susan Cox Powell premiered on Oxygen in May 2019. The two-night special was touted to be the "definitive" account of the investigation, revealing Steven Powell's never-before-seen videos that were seized by police when he was arrested. The documentary included interviews with many who have never spoken out publicly, including Joshua Powell's sister Alina.

In July 2019, the Morbid podcast discussed the case in its 82nd episode The Tragic Case of Susan Powell: Mini Morbid.

In December 2019, the podcast And That's Why We Drink discussed the case in their 152nd episode.

Greg Olsen and Rebecca Morris covered the story in their book If I Can’t Have You: Susan Powell, Her Mysterious Disappearance, and the Murder of Her Children.

Its location is in the vicinity of the area her husband claimed to have gone camping the night his wife disappeared. The headframe of the mineshaft had been torched and destroyed, causing it to fall into the vertical shaft near the time of Susan's disappearance. Sparks and his team excavated about 40,000 pounds of dirt and debris before finding bones of unknown origin and pieces of clothing. Upon having the remains analyzed by forensic scientists, they concluded that the bones were very unlikely to be human.

In June, 2022, the podcast Killer Queens covered the case in a two parted episode (episode 221).

In September 2022, the British podcast Redhanded covered the case in a two parted (episode 264/265)

See also
List of people who disappeared
Murder of Carol DiMaiti
Murder of Hannah Clarke
Murder of Zachary Turner
Bitter Blood

References

External links
Susan Cox Powell Foundation 
Susan Powell timeline Salt Lake Tribune
West Valley and Pierce County Malfeasance website set up by Alina Powell which asserts innocence of Joshua and Steven Powell

1981 births
2005 births
2007 births
2009 in Utah
2012 deaths
2012 in Washington (state)
2012 murders in the United States
2000s missing person cases
American Latter Day Saints
Child abuse resulting in death
December 2009 crimes in the United States
December 2009 events in the United States
February 2012 crimes in the United States
February 2012 events in the United States
Filicides in the United States
History of women in Utah
Missing person cases in Utah
Murder–suicides in the United States
Murdered American children
Mormonism-related controversies
People from West Valley City, Utah
People murdered in Washington (state)